Artibeus aequatorialis (Anderson's fruit-eating bat) is a species of bat in the family Phyllostomidae. The bat is endemic to northwestern South America west of the Andes mountain range. It has been assessed as least concern by the IUCN.

Taxonomy 
It was previously considered a sub-species of A. jamaicensis. Larsen elevated it to species level on the basis of morphometric and genetic data.

Habitat and distribution 
The bat is found in Peru, Ecuador, and Columbia. It inhabits tropical dry forests and tropical lowland forests of the Chocó. It seems to be more common in humid forests.

The northernmost and southernmost extent of its range are unknown.

Conservation 
The species has been assessed as least-concern by the IUCN due to its large range, and relative commonness.

The threats to this species are not known. However, it occurs in some nature reserves (private and national) in its range in western Ecuador. It also occurs in some national parks in Peru.

References 

aequatorialis